Mir Teymur Mir Alakbar oghlu Yagubov (November 6, 1904 – February 17, 1970) was the eighth First Secretary of Azerbaijan Communist Party. 

Land surveyor by profession, Yagubov held various positions within Komsomol of Azerbaijan SSR. In 1936, he became the First Secretary of Komsomol Central Committee and held the position until 1938. In 1938, Yagubov was appointed the Chairman of Supreme Soviet of Azerbaijan SSR. On March 6, 1941 he was relieved from these duties and appointed People's Commissar of Internal Affairs of Azerbaijan SSR and worked in that position until June 1, 1943. In April 1953, Yagubov took the position of the First Secretary of Azerbaijan Communist Party and held the office until he was replaced by Imam Mustafayev.

See also
Minister of Internal Affairs of Azerbaijan

References

1904 births
1970 deaths
Politicians from Baku
People from Baku Governorate
Azerbaijani atheists
First secretaries of the Azerbaijan Communist Party
Commissars 3rd Class of State Security
First convocation members of the Supreme Soviet of the Soviet Union
Second convocation members of the Supreme Soviet of the Soviet Union
Third convocation members of the Supreme Soviet of the Soviet Union
Heads of state of the Azerbaijan Soviet Socialist Republic
Recipients of the Order of Lenin
Recipients of the Order of the Red Banner
Recipients of the Order of the Red Star